Ushiro-geri is the Japanese term for turning back kick, a kick employed in Karate. The kick is a basic move but there are variations of the Ushiro-Geri.

Ushiro-Geri Kekomi 
Ushiro-Geri Keage 
Ushiro-Mawashi-Geri

References

Karate techniques
Japanese martial arts terminology
Kicks